Karmen Ulbin (born 19 February 1995) is a Slovenian footballer who plays as a defender and has appeared for the Slovenia women's national team.

Career
Ulbin has been capped for the Slovenia national team, appearing for the team during the 2019 FIFA Women's World Cup qualifying cycle.

References

External links
 
 
 

1995 births
Living people
Slovenian women's footballers
Slovenia women's international footballers
Women's association football defenders